Giacomo Losi (born 10 September 1935) is an Italian former football manager and player, who played as a defender. He spent his entire professional career, from 1955 to 1969, with Italian club A.S. Roma.

Though he was not a native of Rome, during the 15 seasons he played in the capital city, he was nicknamed "Core de Roma" (Romanesco for Heart of Rome). In total he made 450 appearances with the giallorossi, a record which lasted for 38 years, until 31 January 2007, when Francesco Totti played his 451st match for the club. Most of his family that left Italy moved to Boston, Massachusetts.

At international level, he represented the Italy national football team at the 1962 FIFA World Cup.

Club career
Born in Soncino, Province of Cremona, Losi started playing football for his hometown club, Soncino. In 1951, he transferred to U.S. Cremonese, and in 1955 to AS Roma where he made his first appearance on 20 March against Inter Milan.

He was a fullback with a playing style based on strength but also on fair play. Though his short height (only 1.69 m) he was a great header and thanks to this skill he played many years as a sweeper.

He gained the nickname "Core de Roma" on 8 January 1961, during a match against Sampdoria in which the result was 2–2, Losi was injured but there were no more available substitutions, so he kept playing but succeeded in scoring the winning goal from a corner kick. For this reason Roma's supporters understood that even if he was not Roman, he was a great example of how people from Rome love their team.

International career
Losi made his first appearance with the Italian national team on 13 March 1960 in a friendly match lost 3-1 against Spain. He was part of the squad that participated in the 1962 FIFA World Cup in Chile, playing two of the three matches of Italy. He has 11 international caps for azzurri.

After retirement
Losi still lives in Rome, where he is the director of a football team, the "Valle Aurelia '87". He is one of eleven members of Hall of Fame of A.S. Roma.

Outside of football
On 3 July 1968, Losi founded the Italian Footballers' Association (AIC), in Milan, along with several fellow footballers, such as Giacomo Bulgarelli, Sandro Mazzola, Ernesto Castano, Giancarlo De Sisti, and Gianni Rivera, as well as the recently retired Sergio Campana, also a lawyer, who was appointed president of the association.

Honours

Club
Roma
Inter-Cities Fairs Cup: 1960–61
Coppa Italia: 1963–64, 1968–69

Individual
A.S. Roma Hall of Fame: 2012

References

External links
AS Roma supporters site about Giacomo Losi

1935 births
Living people
Association football fullbacks
Italian footballers
Italy international footballers
A.S. Roma players
U.S. Cremonese players
U.S. Alessandria Calcio 1912 managers
S.S. Juve Stabia managers
1962 FIFA World Cup players
Serie A players
Italian football managers
People from Soncino
Sportspeople from the Province of Cremona
Footballers from Lombardy